The pyramid of Teti is a smooth-sided pyramid situated in the pyramid field at Saqqara in Egypt.  It is the second known pyramid containing pyramid texts.  Excavations have revealed a satellite pyramid, two pyramids of queens accompanied by cult structures, and a funerary temple.  The pyramid was opened by Gaston Maspero in 1882 and the complex explored during several campaigns ranging from 1907 to 1965. It was originally called Teti's Places Are Enduring. The preservation above ground is very poor, and it now resembles a small hill. Below ground the chambers and corridors are very well preserved.

The funerary complex 

The pyramid complex of Teti follows a model established during the reign of Djedkare Isesi, the arrangement of which is inherited from the funerary complexes of Abusir.

A valley temple, now lost, was probably destroyed in antiquity due to the place of an Old Kingdom temple dedicated to Anubis constructed there. A better known funerary temple, revealed by James Edward Quibell in 1906, is connected to the valley temple by a causeway. The plan of the temple of Teti is also comparable to that of Unas, its immediate predecessor. Teti's temple has a somewhat special plan, however, due to a deviation of the floor which traditionally should have been located in the axis of the temple but here is moved south. It then accesses the temple through a hallway of the north–south facade joining the east–west axis of the monument. Followed in this main axis is a second hall. The thickness of the walls suggests a vaulted cover. It was probably the "Room of the Greats", on the walls of which the royal family and influential members of the court were to be represented assisting and accompanying the eternal journey of their sovereign.

This hall opened into an open courtyard surrounded on all four sides by colonnades whose main purpose was the presentation of daily offerings and ritual libations. The only way out is centered to the west and provides access to the innermost part the sanctuary.

Included in the Peribolos, a sacred part of the royal pyramid reserved for priests of the king, was a chapel containing the five Naos, housing five statues of the King appearing in the aspect of the five principal deities of the realm. This part also included a private room containing the false door stela of the King, a veritable object of funeral worship, and a double row of stores on both sides of the axis of the temple. The first row frames the party host and is accessible by a long corridor along the entire width of the building that leads to the south and north within the peribolos of the pyramid. The second set frames the sanctuary and the hall of statues of gods and was only accessible from the latter.

The last element essential to the funerary cult, the satellite-pyramid encircled in its own peribolos, is located southeast of the royal pyramid and therefore was accessible only through a corridor of stores and halls of worship. This small pyramid covers an underground plan consisting of a short ramp leading to a single underground chamber. In the middle of the courtyard of the paribolos, facing east and west, are two landscaped basins in the granite floor. Their use is disputed by Egyptologists, but the location of these basins, following the path of the sun, suggests ritual practices that shed some light on the role of this monument.

The pyramid 

The orientation of the pyramid is not aligned with the four cardinal points. However, the proportions and plan of the pyramid follow exactly the same pattern as that of the pyramid of Djedkare Isesi. The internal dimensions and slope are the same and it is otherwise very similar.

Access to the burial chambers are located inside the adjoining chapel against the north face of the pyramid. The entrance hallway leads to a long descent of eighteen hundred and twenty-three metres. The entrance was once blocked by a plug of granite now lost. The descending passage was probably clogged along its length by large blocks of limestone that thieves have broken up. The debris still littered the passage at the time of discovery. In the descending corridor is a successive horizontal hallway, a vestibule, another hallway, a bedroom with harrows, a final corridor, and a final granite passage which opens into the funerary apartments of the King.

The room with harrows spans more than six metres and is designed with alternating limestone and granite. The three granite harrows, originally lowered, are now broken into several pieces leaving the way open to visitors.

The horizontal passage leads to rooms consisting of a funeral serdab, an antechamber, and a burial chamber.  All three are aligned along an east–west axis. The only peculiarity of the serdab is the size of the block ensuring its coverage, measuring 6.72 metres long with a weight of forty tons. The antechamber and burial chamber are covered with huge vaulted rafters. They are connected by a passage where access was closed by a double door. The walls of these rooms are covered with hieroglyphic inscriptions commonly called the Pyramid Texts. The pyramid of Teti is the second royal monument to contain the complex theological corpus to assist and support the rebirth of the king.

The burial chamber contains an unfinished greywacke sarcophagus,  a fragment of a lid and a canopic container that is nothing more than a simple hole in the ground. And for the first time, a royal sarcophagus contains inscriptions, here slightly etched on the hollow interior of the vessel.

Although looted since ancient times, remains of the king's grave goods were found during the first excavation of the monument. Consisting mainly of stone materials, these objects have been abandoned by looters, probably considered useless or worthless. Thus, a series of club heads with the names of Teti has reached us and one of the canopic jars containing the viscera of the king. The most troubling item found among the debris of the funeral viaticum is the plaster mold of a death mask. The reproduced molding transmits to us the face of a man with eyes closed, mouth slightly open. The expression is striking and it is purported to be an image of Teti making it the only true royal portrait that has survived from the Old Kingdom.
The Egyptian Royal Cubit is estimated at 525 mm. Teti's pyramid measures 78.5 per side at the base and the height is 52.5 m. These are equal to 150 cubits per side at the base and 100 cubits high. The core was a built in steps and accretions made of small, locally quarried stone and debris fill. This was covered with a layer of dressed limestone which has been removed, causing the core to slump

Interior Photographs

The Necropolis of Teti 
All around the funerary complex of the king extends one of the richest parts of the necropolis of Saqqara. The king, whose special destiny seems to have impressed his contemporaries, will be revered later as a divine mediator along with a few courtiers who have in some sense inherited it by reputation.  The king was also accompanied by his two principal wives who each had a pyramid accompanied with a temple of worship.

Among the many tombs that form this necropolis of the Sixth Dynasty of Egypt include:
 The pyramid complex of Khuit II;
 The pyramid complex of Iput;
 The pyramid complex of Sesheshet I, the king's mother;
 The mastaba of Tetiankhkem, royal prince, son of Teti and Khuit;
 The mastaba of Kagemni, Vizier of Teti;
 The mastaba of Ankhmahor;
 The mastaba of Mereruka.

During the Middle Kingdom, the cult of the king was assured as evidenced by recent discoveries to the east of Teti's pyramid of the tombs of Sa-Hathor-Ipy and of Sekoueskhet (Sekweskhet). These were two priests attached to the worship of the famous pharaoh.

In the New Kingdom, other graves are arranged near the funerary complex of Teti, who is sometimes referred to as a true deity. Mose, a scribe, had his decorated tomb chapel here. Under the reign of Ramses II, Khaemwaset, the royal prince and High Priest of Ptah, would even restore the pyramid of the distant ruler, taking care to re-register his name on one side of his pyramid.

Finally, in the Late Period, popular enthusiasm for the gods of Saqqara increased to the point that a temple dedicated to Anubis is built on the funerary complex of Teti whose pyramid continued to dominate the entire valley and would remain a sacred monument to all the devotees who borrowed while along dromos leading to the Serapeum of Saqqara and which skirted the venerable pyramid of Teti.

See also

Egyptian pyramid construction techniques
List of Egyptian pyramids
List of megalithic sites

References

Sources 

 David P. Silverman, Middle Kingdom tombs in the Teti pyramid cemetery, Abusir and Saqqara in the Year 2000, Prague, 2000
 Cecil Mallaby Firth, The Teti pyramid cemeteries, Excavations at Saqqara, Egyptian Department of Antiquities, Cairo, 1926;
 Jean-Philippe Lauer & Jean Leclant, Le temple haut du complexe funéraire du roi Téti, Bulletin d'Études n°51, 1972;
 Sydney Aufrère & Jean-Claude Golvin, L'Égypte restituée, 1997;
 Jean-Pierre Adam & Christiane Ziegler, Les pyramides d'Égypte, 1999;
 Audran Labrousse, L'architecture des pyramides à textes, 2000.

Saqqara
Teti
Teti